Günter Dietrich (November 15, 1911 – October 2, 1972) was a German oceanographer. He was the first to describe the Agulhas Current in detail, he provided essential contributions to the understanding of bottom water exchange in the North Atlantic and he shaped marine research in Germany after World War II.

Early life and academic work

Günter Dietrich was born in Berlin. From 1931 to 1935 he studied geography, meteorology, mathematics, physics and oceanography at the Friedrich-Wilhelms-Universität zu Berlin (see Humboldt University of Berlin). He received his Doctor of Philosophy in 1935. with a dissertation on the structure and dynamics of the Agulhas Current. His advisor was Albert Defant. This work provided the first detailed description of the Agulhas Current System, based on observational data available at the time. The South African oceanographer Johann Lutjeharms later called him "the first true oceanographer of the Agulhas Current System" in his book on the Agulhas Current 

From 1935 to 1943 he was scientific assistant at the :de:Museum für Meereskunde (Berlin) (Institute and Museum for Oceanography) and participated in four cruises on the German survey ship Meteor in the North Atlantic and the Caribbean Sea. He was drafted into the German Navy during World War II (WWII) and served  as oceanographer at the Naval Observatory in Wilhelmshaven and Greifswald. He was in charge of 12 cruises on the navy survey ships "Triton" and "Börgen" in the Baltic Sea and off Norway. The tasks included investigations of sound propagation, tides and tidal currents. During WWII he was able to obtain his habilitation (permission to teach) for geophysics and oceanography in 1943 at Berlin University with a thesis on semidiurnal and diurnal tides  and was appointed custodian at the Institute for Oceanography in Berlin. After the end of WWII and some time as prisoner of war, he was employed by the British Navy occupying forces, partly at their headquarters in Hamburg-Blankenese, from April 1946 to August 1950. He also ran an engineering consultancy on oceanographic instrumentation during part of the time.  In 1950 he became a member of the German Hydrographic Office (DHI) in Hamburg (see Federal Maritime and Hydrographic Agency of Germany). He was responsible for regional oceanography and participated in several cruises on the survey and research vessels "Gauss" and "Anton Dohrn". He also became a lecturer in oceanography at Hamburg University in 1953 and adjunct professor in 1957  

In 1959 he became the successor of Georg Wüst in Kiel. He was appointed Professor of Oceanography and Maritime Meteorology at the Christian Albrecht University in Kiel (see University of Kiel) and Director of the Institut für Meereskunde Kiel (see ) of Kiel University . Under his direction the institute increased considerably, international relationships were renewed   and Kiel University became the prime institution for marine sciences education in Germany. His textbook    was the standard reading for students. Dietrich also carried outstanding responsibility in planning the new research vessel "Meteor" . The ship was put into service in 1964 and had its first major cruise in the International Indian Ocean Expedition in 1964/1965. Dietrich later had major responsibilities in planning and preparing the multi-national ICES expedition OVERFLOW 1973. He died in Kiel, aged 60, a few months before the start of the program.

The main topics in Dietrich's 149 publications  are: the dynamics of ocean currents, the stratification and mixing of water masses and their variability, the morphology of the ocean's bottom and the influence of topography on the spreading of water masses, and sound propagation in the ocean. During the work for his doctoral dissertation on the Agulhas Current System  he was able to use data sets from the "Meteor" Expedition 1925-1927  and additional data from some other ships. For the first time the Agulhas Current System was described also in deep layers. He also compared the properties of the Agulhas Current and the Gulf Stream  and described the Agulhas Current as a branch of the Atlantic circulation. He remained interested in the Gulf Stream, in particular in the relationship of pressure fields and currents   and the origin of Gulf Stream water masses. With geography as an essential field in his education, he kept returning to morphological studies     and to the relationship of topography and bottom water flow. He contributed considerably to the knowledge on the transport, distribution and mixing of water masses in the North Atlantic, the North Sea, the Baltic Sea and the Mediterranean. A selection of papers is cited here. The hydrographic atlas of the northern North Atlantic, produced on behalf of ICES, became an important collection of observational results. Following his work on semidiurnal and diurnal tides, he became a respected expert on tides in the open ocean. During a time when the tides in the open ocean had to be determined solely from coastal gauges, his tidal maps were considered a standard in the field. Dietrich was always prepared to use an holistic approach in marine research. He was interested in interdisciplinary problems, in particular the interactions between bottom topography and fisheries hydrography In his textbook    he frequently discussed relations between the results of different disciplines.

Family

Günter Dietrich was married to Liselotte Dietrich, née Martin, since 1939. They had two children. The son drowned at young age. Dietrich's daughter Sigrid married the marine geologist :de:Jörn Thiede in 1970.

Awards

Honorary Doctorate, University of Rennes, France, 1970

Memberships

Member, Academy of Sciences Leopoldina, Halle, from 1969 

Member, German Scientific Commission for Marine Research, 1950-1972

Member, Advisory Board of the Federal Ministry for Science and Technology 

Member, Advisory Board of the Institute of Sea Fisheries 

Member, Commission on Marine Research and Marine Technology, Federal Ministry for Research and Technology, 1969-1972

Offices

Director, Oceanographic Institute of Kiel University, 1959-1968 

Chair, German Scientific Commission for Marine Research, 1959-1969 

Dean, Faculty of Mathematics and Sciences, University of Kiel, 1965

Marine Science Advisor to Unesco, from 1958 

Senator, German Research Foundation (Deutsche Forschungsgemeinschaft (DFG), 1964-1969 

Chair, Senate Commission on Oceanography, DFG, 1962-1969

Chair, Hydrographic Committee, ICES, 1966-1969

Vicepresident, International Council for the Exploration of the Sea (ICES), 1967-1970 

Chair, German Committee for the Scientific Committee on Oceanic Research (SCOR/ICSU), 1964-1967 

President, International Association for the Physical Sciences of the Ocean (IAPSO/IUGG), 1967-1970  

First Chair, Joint Panel on Oceanographic Tables and Standards (JPOTS) of Unesco, ICES, SCOR, IAPSO 

Captain Cook Chair for Oceanography, University of Hawaii, Honolulu, U.S.A., 1969-1970

Bibliography

English translations of titles are provided in parentheses.

References

References 

1911 births
1972 deaths
Scientists from Berlin
German oceanographers
Humboldt University of Berlin alumni